IRNSS-1G was the seventh and final of the Indian Regional Navigation Satellite System (IRNSS) series of satellites after IRNSS-1A, IRNSS-1B, IRNSS-1C, IRNSS-1D, IRNSS-1E and IRNSS-1F. This system of satellites will provide navigational services to the Indian region. The satellite was launched successfully on 28 April 2016 at 07:20 UTC.

IRNSS-1G along IRNSS-1A is being used only for NavIC's short message broadcast service and not for navigation.

Launch 
The satellite was launched from the First Launch Pad (FLP) of Satish Dhawan Space Centre, Sriharikota on board PSLV-C33 XL on 28 April 2016 at 12:50 PM IST. The countdown of the launch had begun 51:30 hours before at 9:20 AM IST on 25 April 2016.

After the launch of IRNSS-1G the Indian government named the IRNSS system as NAVIC (Navigation with Indian Constellation).

Specifications 
Mission life: 12 years (planned). 

Lift-off mass: 

Dry mass: .

Payload: CDMA ranging payload in C band. Navigation payload in L-5 and S band spectrums and Rubidium atomic clocks. 

Power: Two triple-junction solar panels to generate 1660W of energy and one Lithium-ion 90A-hr battery is used.

Propulsion: MMH/MON3 based bipropellant system with 12×22N Attitude control thrusters and one 440N LAM.

Orbit: Geosynchronous orbit at 129.5° East longitude with 5° inclination. 

Cost: Approximately .

See also

 Communication-Centric Intelligence Satellite (CCI-Sat)
 GPS-aided geo-augmented navigation (GAGAN)
 Satellite navigation

References

External links 
 ISRO Future Programmes

Spacecraft launched by India in 2016
IRNSS satellites
Spacecraft launched by PSLV rockets